Eburia amabilis is a species of beetle in the family Cerambycidae found on the Galapagos Islands and in Panama.

References

amabilis
Beetles described in 1859